In Mesopotamian mythology, the Tablet of Destinies was envisaged as a clay tablet inscribed with cuneiform writing, also impressed with cylinder seals, which, as a permanent legal document, conferred upon the god Enlil his supreme authority as ruler of the universe.

Other mention 
In the Sumerian poem Ninurta and the Turtle it is the god Enki, rather than Enlil, who holds the Tablet; it therefore resides with Enki in the Abzu.  Both this poem and the Akkadian Anzû poem concern the theft of the tablet by the bird Imdugud (Sumerian) or Anzû (Akkadian) from its original owner (Enki or Enlil). In the Babylonian Enuma Elish, Tiamat bestows this tablet on Kingu and gives him command of her army. In the end, the Tablet always returns to Enlil.

See also
List of Mythological Objects

References 

Mesopotamian mythology
Enūma Eliš
Tiamat